Wu Yanan (born 7 December 1964) is a Chinese archer.

Archery

She competed at the 1984 Summer Olympic Games in the women's individual event and finished eighth with 2493 points scored.

References

External links 
 
 

1964 births
Living people
Chinese female archers
Olympic archers of China
Archers at the 1984 Summer Olympics